Abdulići is a village in the municipality of Bratunac, Bosnia and Herzegovina. It lies near the bank of the Drina River. According to the 1991 census it had a population of 327 people, 99.39% of whom were Muslims.

References

Villages in Republika Srpska
Populated places in Bratunac